Harilal Upadhyay (Gujarati: હરિલાલ ઉપાધ્યાય) was a Gujarati novelist and poet. He wrote more than 100 books.

Life
Harilal Upadhyay was born on 22 January 1916 in Mota Khijadiya village near Rajkot in a Brahmin family of Jadavji and Gangaben. His father was a priest in a temple at Makaji Meghpar. He completed his primary education from Paddhari while living with his father's elder brother Bhavanishankar and sister Dayakunwarben. He moved to Jamnagar and studied in Sanskrit Pathshala where he mastered in traditional rituals and texts under Trambakram Shastri.

He started writing poetry during his stay in Jamnagar. At the age of 13, he recited a poem in public. His first short story, "Hridaypalto", was published in Modhbandhu magazine at the age of 15, and another story was published in Beghadi Moj. He was connected with traditional bards and folk stories during this period. He was influenced by the bard Krishnada. He returned to Makaji Meghpar but he was not interested in priesthood. His uncle Bhavanishankar was also a traditional story teller and musician who used to go to different princely states for performance in royal courts. He went with him to different places and started taking notes on folk stories, incidents and folk songs. He also learned poetry presentation from him. He met Vajubhai Shulka, an Indian independence activist from Rajkot. He studied politics there and also wrote a 500 stanza long poem, "Tanya". Vajubhai brought "Tanya" to Bombay. After reading it, Harilal was invited to Bombay by Amritlal Sheth, journalist and the founder of Janmabhoomi newspaper.

He moved to Bombay and published his first short story collection, Jeevanchhaya, on the insistence of K. M. Munshi. He later moved to Paddhari and continued to write from there.

He died on 15 January 1994 in Paddhari, Gujarat, India.

Works
Historical novels
He wrote a large number of historical novels. His Mewad or Suryavansh/Rajasthan historical novel series include Mevad Ni Tejchhaya, Mevad Na Maharathi : NariRatna PannaDai, Chittod Ni Rangarjana : RoopRani Padmini, Mevad No Kesri, ShauryaPratapi Maharana Pratap. Deshgaurav Bhamashah, and Jay Chittod. His Chandravansh/Gujarat historical novel series include  ShauryaPratapi Chandravansh,  Rudhir Nu Rajtilak, Lakho Fulani, Ranmedan, Ek Bhalo Saput, Tati Talvar, Navanagar Na Narbanka, Managal Fera, Rajsatta Na Rang, Nayan Ughadyu Ne Phool Kharyu, KachchhBhoomi Na Kesri, and Padata Gadh Na Padchhaya (Part 1 and 2). His books on Modh Brahmins are Otrada Vayara Utho Utho and  Sonavarani (the history of Modh Brahmins). His social novels set in historical background are Kalank Ane Kirtirekha, Vijay Vardaan, Bhagya devata, Roshani, and Aparajita.

He wrote seven book series on Indian epic Mahabharata which include  Bhishma Pratigna, Dharma Pratigna, Kurukshetra, Bhishma No Shantibodh, Dharma Vijay, Mahaprasthaan and Yog Viyog.

Social novels
 Ramkali (RoopMangala)
 Rahi Gai Man Ni Man Ma
 Gauri
 Tan Bhukhya Koi Dhan Bhukhya
 Preete Parovaya
 Dharati Lal Gulal
 Nathi Sukaya Neer
 Sukh Savaya Thay
 Kundan Chadyu Kante
 Savazada Senjal Pie
 Man Dubya Mrugjal Ma
 KesarBhino Kanth
 Varso Re Ur na Amee
 AmrutBhini Ankhaladi
 Tej Chhavai Raat
 Haiye Madhaya Het
 Nisha Sunave Naad
 Alka
 ManPankhi Na Mala
 Kanchan Lage Na Kaat
 Antar Khole Ankh
 Nari Hati Ek Namani
 Paras Sparshe Ek J War
 Ugyo Chandra Amase
 Dhabakatu Dhan
 Rajpur Ni Lachhu
 Van Man Khili Vasant
 Gori To Gunial Bhali
 Dharm Ane Rajkaran
 Andhkaar Chhaya
 Saheli 
 Sukhlalsa
 Man Ne Lagi Maya
 Pagla Padya Kankuvarna
 Chhanydee
 Roshnee

Short story collections
 Saurashtra No Vartaras
 Saurashtra Ni Rasgatha (2 parts)
 Saurashtra Ni Veergathao (5 parts)
 Sorthi Lokvato
 Jeevanchhaya
 PushpMangal (BaalVartao – kids' literature)

Biographies
 Harsiddhi Ane Hinglaj
 Sant Dada Mekan
 Sant Dharamshi Bhagat
 Mast Avdhoot Moondiya Swami
 Naag Mahima
 Chhelnami Saurashtra
 Karma Prabhaav
 ShaktiParichay (about Mahadevi Hinglajmata, Mahadevi Harsiddhi and Mahadevi Khodiyar)

Children's literature
 Pushpamangal

Play
 Najar Samena Shamana (Dreams in Front of the Eyes)

Recognition
 Jyotirvigyan Sanshodhan Award
 Kanaiyalal Munshi Award

See also
 List of Indian writers

References

External links
 

Indian male novelists
1994 deaths
1916 births
Gujarati-language writers
20th-century Indian novelists
Poets from Gujarat
People from Rajkot district
Novelists from Gujarat
20th-century Indian poets
20th-century Indian male writers